Skal vi danse is the Norwegian edition of the British television series, Strictly Come Dancing. It is produced by Monster Entertainment and broadcast on TV 2 Jon Peder Olrud and Geir Bie were producers in the first season. The second and third seasons were produced by Ingvild Daae. The series premiered on TV 2 on January 15, 2006. Skal vi danse? in Norwegian means "shall we dance?" and the Dancing celebrities with professional dancers and companies are reviewed by a panel of judges and the TV viewers. Each pair consists of a celebrity and a professional dancer and the one with the fewest votes does not participate in the next round.

The series has had high ratings in Norway, with an average of between 600,000 and 700,000 viewers. The record with 733,000 viewers on average in the season premiere was reached for the first program of series 4 (12 September 2008). Only the final episodes of each series have had higher numbers.

Hosts

 Full time presenter
 Competed as a contestant before being a presenter

Judges

 Full time presenter
 Competed as a contestant before being a presenter

Professional partners
Color key:

 Winner
 Runner-up
 3rd place
 Celebrity partner was eliminated first for the season
 Celebrity partner withdrew from the competition
 A professional couple of weeks, and then does not appear on the show

Series overview

Attendees

Season 1 (Spring 2006)

In the first season Simen Agdestein, Terje Sporsem, Katrine Moholt, Caroline Dina Kongerud, Signy Fardal, Finn Schjøll, Tom A. Haug, Anita Moen, Otto Robsahm and Guri Schanke took part. The series was won by Katrine Moholt and dance partner Bjørn Holthe, who defeated Guri Schanke and dance partner Tom Arild Hansen in the final.
Judges in the first season were Anita Langset, Trine Dehli Cleve, Trond Harr and Tor Fløysvik.

 Simen Agdestein (chess player/coach) (partnered by Gyda Kathrine Bloch Svela-Thorsen)
 Terje Sporsem (comedian) (partnered by Cecilie Brink Rygel)
 Katrine Moholt (TV hostess) (partnered by Bjørn Wettre Holthe)
 Caroline Dina Kongerud (singer) (partnered by Gustaf Lundin)
 Signy Fardal (publisher and magazine editor) (partnered by Geir Gundersen)
 Finn Schjøll (flower decorator) (partnered by Lena Granaas Lillebø)
 Tom A. Haug (actor) (partnered by Therese Cleve)
 Anita Moen (Former Cross-country skier) (partnered by Thomas Kagnes)
 Otto Robsahm (handyman) (partnered by Michelle Lindøe)
 Guri Schanke (actress and singer) (partnered by Tom Arild Hansen)

The Season Finale took place in March 2006. Winners were TV hostess Katrine Moholt and her partner Bjørn Wettre Holthe.

The professional jury in "Skal Vi Danse"s 1st Season were:
 Trine Dehli Cleve
 Tor Fløysvik
 Anita Langset
 Trond Harr

Season 2 (Autumn 2006)
In the second season took part Jeanette Roede, Trude Mostue, Christer Torjussen, Elisabeth Andreassen, Tone Damli Aaberge, Susann Goksør Bjerkrheim, Eirik Newth, Steffen Tangstad, Kristian Ødegård and Ingar Helge Gimle. The second season was won by Kristian Ødegård and his dancing partner Alexandra Kakurina. They defeated Susann Goksør Bjerkrheim and Asmund Grinaker.

Judges in the second season was Cecilie Brinck Rygel, Trine Dehli Cleve, Trond Harr and Tor Fløysvik.

 Jeanette Roede, administrative manager. She was partnered by Jan-Eric Fransson
 Trude Mostue, TV-Veterinarian. She was partnered by Tom Arild Hansen
 Christer Torjussen, comedian. He was partnered by Lena Granaas Lillebø
 Elisabeth Andreassen, singer. She was partnered by Mats Brattlie
 Tone Damli Aaberge, singer. She was partnered by Tom-Erik Nilsen
 Susann Goksør Bjerkrheim, former handball-player. She was partnered by Asmund G. S. Grinaker
 Eirik Newth, writer and radio host. He was partnered by Therese Cleve
 Steffen Tangstad, former professional boxer, now a sports manager. He was partnered by Ingrid Beate Thompson
 Kristian Ødegård, TV-producer and comedian/joke host. He was partnered by Alexandra Kakurina
 Ingar Helge Gimle, actor. He was partnered by Gyda Kathrine Bloch Svela-Thorsen

The Season Finale took place on 24 November 2006. Winners were TV-producer/comedian/joke host Kristian Ødegård and his dancing partner Alexandra Kakurina.

The professional jury in "Skal Vi Danse"s 2nd Season were:
 Trine Dehli Cleve
 Tor Fløysvik
 Cecilie Brinck Rygel
 Trond Harr

Season 3 (Autumn 2007)
In the third season took part Mari Maurstad, Jostein Pedersen, Dag Otto Lauritzen, Esben Esther Pirelli Benestad, Tshawe Baqwa, Trine Hattestad, Pia Haraldsen, Liv Marit Wedvik, Mona Grudt and Finn Christian Jagge. The third season was won by Tshawe Baqwa and his dance partner Maria Sandvik. They defeated Mona Grudt and Glenn Jørgen Sandaker.

Judges in the third season was Christer Tornell, Trine Dehli Cleve, Trond Harr and Tor Fløysvik

 Tshawe Baqwa, rapper. He was partnered by Maria Sandvik – Winner
 Esben Esther Pirelli Benestad, transvestite doctor. He was partnered by Ingrid Beate Thompson
 Mona Grudt, former Miss Universe. She was partnered by Glenn Jørgen Sandaker
 Pia Haraldsen, TV host. She was partnered by Thomas Wendel
 Trine Hattestad, former athlete. She was partnered by Mats Brattlie
 Finn Christian Jagge, former alpine skier. He was partnered by Therese Cleve
 Dag Otto Lauritzen, former cyclist. He was partnered by Gyda Kathrine Bloch Svela-Thorsen
 Mari Maurstad, entertainer. She was partnered by Jan Eric Fransson
 Jostein Pedersen, TV host. He was partnered by Michelle Lindøe
 Liv Marit Wedvik, country singer. She was partnered by Asmund Grinaker

Season 4 (Autumn 2008)
 
In the fourth season attended Gaute Ormåsen, Hans Petter Buraas, Tor Endresen, Tore André Flo, Janne Formoe, Mikkel Gaup, Siri Kalvig, Hanne Krogh, Jenny Skavlan, Sigurd Sollien and Lene Alexandra Øien. The fourth season was won by Lene Alexandra Øien and dance partner Tom Erik Nilsen, which in the final defeated Tore Andre Flo and his dance partner Nadya Khamitskaya. Judges were Trine Dehli Cleve, Tor Fløysvik, Christer Tornell and Alexandra Kakurina.

 Hans Petter Buraas, alpine skier – eliminated 3rd
 Tor Endresen, singer eliminated 5th
 Tore Andre Flo, football player – runner-up
 Janne Formoe, actress – eliminated 1st
 Mikkel Gaup, actor
 Siri Kalvig, meteorologist
 Hanne Krogh, singer -eliminated 4th
 Gaute Ormåsen, singer
 Jenny Skavlan, actress – eliminated 2nd
 Sigurd Sollien, TV host – withdrawn
 Lene Alexandra Øien, singer and model – winner

Super Finals (Autumn 2008)
12 December 2008 was held a great finale in Skal vi dance? in which the winning pairs from the four previous seasons, participated. Since Tshawe Baqwa was on a concert tour at the time of the super-final took second pair from 2007 instead of the winning pair. Super Final was won by Mona Grudt and Glenn Jørgen Sandaker. Judges were Trine Dehli Cleve, Tor Fløysvik, Christer Tornell, Cecilie Brinck Rygel, Trond Harr and Raymond Myhr Engen. Super final winners were chosen by judges depending by points.

Results of choosing to win in super finals.

Total results

1st result

Second Result

Third Result

Season 5 (Autumn 2009)

In the fifth season competed Mia Gundersen, Hallvard Flatland, Anita Valen, Ellen Arnstad, Ole Klemetsen, Jan Thomas Mørch Husby, Elin Tvedt, Triana Iglesias, Carsten Skjelbreid, Margrethe Røed and Svein Østvik. Carsten Skjelbreid won the competition in the final against Mia Gundersen. Judges were Trine Dehli Cleve, Tor Fløysvik, Karianne Gulliksen Stensen and Christer Tornell.

 Mia Gundersen,
 Hallvard Flatland,
 Anita Valen,
 Ellen Arnstad,
 Ole Klemetsen,
 Jan Thomas Mørch Husby,
 Elin Tvedt,
 Triana Iglesias,
 Carsten Skjelbreid,
 Margrethe Røed and
 Svein Østvik.

Red numbers indicate the lowest score for each week.
Green numbers indicate the highest score for each week.
 indicates the winning couple.
 indicates the runner-up couple.

The judges are Trine Dehli Cleve, Tor Fløysvik, Karianne Stensen Gulliksen and Christer Tornell.

Season 6 (Autumn 2010)

In the sixth season of Skal vi danse? will return on Autumn 2010 according to TV 2 after the finale of season 5 Skal vi danse? decided to renew for this season. These are the participants who are going to participate in Skal vi danse? this year. Judges are the same from last year Trine Dehli Cleve, Tor Fløysvik, Karianne Gulliksen Stensen and Christer Tornell.

 Maria Haukaas Mittet, singer (partnered by Asmund Grinaker)
 Håvard Lilleheie, TV host (partnered by Elena Bokoreva Wiulsrud)
 Aylar Lie, former glamour model (partnered by Egor Filipenko)
 Stig Henrik Hoff, actor (partnered by Alexandra Kakourina)
 Cecilie Skog, adventurer (partnered by Tobias Karlsson)
 Cato Zahl Pedersen, multiple Paralympic gold winner (partnered by Marianne Sandaker)
 Anne-Marie Ottersen, actress (partnered by Glenn Jørgen Sandaker)
 Tommy Fredvang, singer (partnered by Rakel Kristina Aalmo)
 Stine Buer, comedian (partnered by Tom-Erik Nilsen)
 Einar Gelius, priest (partnered by Olga Divakova)
 Andrine Flemmen, former alpine skier (partnered by Lars Alexander Wiulsrud)
 Åsleik Engmark, comedian (partnered by Nadya Khamitskaya)

Season 7 (Autumn 2011)

 Rachel Nordtømme, runner (partnered by Henrik Frisk)
 Inger Lise Hansen, politician (partnered by Lars Alexander Wiulsrud)
 Noman Mubashir, journalist (partnered by Nadya Khamitskaya)
 Stella Mwangi, singer (partnered by Asmund Grinaker)
 Anna Anka, reality TV star (partnered by Glenn Jorgen Sandaker)
 Lars Bohinen, footballer (partnered by Alexandra Kakourina)
 Kari Traa, skier (partnered by Egor Filipenko)
 Rune Larsen, music journalist (partnered by Olga Divakova)
 Atle Pettersen, singer (partnered by Marianne Sandaker)
 Anders Jacobsen, ski jumper (partnered by Elena Bokoreva Wiulsrud)

Season 8 (Autumn 2012)

 Ben Adams, singer (partnered by Tone Jacobsen)
 Lars Erik Blokkhus, singer (partnered by Maria Sandvik)
 Stein Johan Grieg Halvorsen, actor/comedian (partnered by Marianne Sandaker)
 Cathrine Larsåsen, pole vaulter (partnered by Tom-Erik Nilsen)
 Linni Meister, singer & model (partnered by Calle Sterner)
 Marit Mikkelsplass, skier (partnered by Lars Alexander Wiulsrud)
 Lillian Müller, actress/model (partnered by Glenn Jorgen Sandaker)
 Lasse Ottesen, ski jumper (partnered by Olga Divakova)
 Vebjørn Sand, painter (partnered by Nadya Khamitskaya)
 Hanne Sørvaag, singer (partnered by Egor Filipenko)
 Eldar Vågan, guitarist (partnered by Elena Bokoreva Wiulsrud)

See also
Dancing with the Stars United States
Strictly Come Dancing
Season 4 of Skal vi danse?
Season 5 of Skal vi danse?
Season 6 of Skal vi danse?
Season 7 of Skal vi danse?
Season 8 of Skal vi danse?

References

External links
  - TV 2

Skal vi Danse at Monster Entertainment

 
TV 2 (Norway) original programming
2006 Norwegian television series debuts
Norwegian music television series
Norwegian reality television series
Norwegian television series based on British television series